Mount Nansen is a deeply eroded Mid-Cretaceous stratovolcano located  west of Carmacks and  west of Victoria Mountain in the central Yukon, Canada. It consists of rhyolite, dacite, andesite flows, breccias and tuff. Mount Nansen was formed during subducting under North America during the Mid-Cretaceous.

See also
List of volcanoes in Canada
Volcanology of Canada

References

External links
 Mount Nansen in the Canadian Mountain Encyclopedia

Fridtjof Nansen
One-thousanders of Yukon
Stratovolcanoes of Canada
Subduction volcanoes
Volcanoes of Yukon